The long-snout dace (Leuciscus oxyrrhis) is a species of cyprinid fish, found in the Garonne drainage in France.

References 

Leuciscus
Fish described in 1873